Mohammed Badi Uzzaman Azmi (8 March 1939 – 14 June 2011), better known as Badi Uzzaman, was a Pakistani-British television and film actor. According to The Guardian, Uzzaman was perhaps best known for his role as a hospital patient in the 1986 television series, The Singing Detective, opposite actor Michael Gambon.  He later appeared in numerous television roles during his career, often as a supporting character, including Torchwood, Inspector Morse, Coronation Street, Cracker, The Bill and Casualty.

Uzzaman was born on 8 March 1939, in Phulpur, Azamgarh, British India. His father worked for the railway industry, so he moved to the city of Abbottabad in present-day Pakistan. He continued to move with his family depending on his father's job transfers, which included time in both Quetta and Lahore. Uzzaman graduated from Government College, Abbottabad, in 1959, where he studied English and Urdu.

Uzzaman began his career as a radio presenter in Pakistan. He switched to acting, appearing in roles of Pakistan Television Corporation (PTV) following the state-owned channel's launch in 1964.

In 1984, Uzzaman was cast in Malia, a Pakistani film about a traveling fair with a strong, underlying theme against the martial law imposed by the government of General Muhammad Zia-ul-Haq. In the film, Uzzaman played five different characters.  The film was sharply rebuked by Zia's government, and had to be completed in London. Uzzaman left Pakistan and was granted political asylum in the United Kingdom soon after Malia's release. He became a British citizen.

At the age of 72, Uzzaman died of a lung infection on 14 June 2011.

Partial filmography

Intekhab (1978)
Mehman (1978)
My Beautiful Laundrette (1985) - Dealer
Christmas Present (1985) - Mr. Amir Mehrban
Personal Services (1987) - Mr. Patel
Sammy and Rosie Get Laid (1987) - Ghost
Cry Freedom (1987) - Mortician's assistant
Bellman and True (1987) - Shopkeeper
Karachi (1989) - Family father
Lebewohl, Fremde (1991) - Badi
K2 (1991) - Ibrahim
Immaculate Conception (1992) - Dadaji's Retainer
Son of the Pink Panther (1993) - Wasim
Bhaji on the Beach (1993) - Uncle
Brothers in Trouble (1995) - Old Ram
My Son the Fanatic (1997) - Man in mosque
You're Dead (1999) - Dr. Chandra
Mad Cows (1999) - Indian shopkeeper
Kevin & Perry Go Large (2000) - Shopkeeper
The Fourth Angel (2001) - Dr. Mackay
All or Nothing (2002) - Passenger #1
Cross My Heart (2003) - Vikram
The Baby Juice Express (2004) - Singh
Yasmin (2004) - Hassan
Red Mercury (2005) - Mr. Mulley
Eastern Promises (2007) - Chemist
In Your Dreams (2008) - Kung fu waiter
Caught in the Act (2008) - Mr. Patel
Another Year (2010) - Mr. Gupta
Forget Me Not (2010) - Shopkeeper

References

External links

1939 births
2011 deaths
British male television actors
British male film actors
English people of Pakistani descent
Muhajir people
Naturalised citizens of the United Kingdom
Pakistani emigrants to the United Kingdom
People from Abbottabad
British film actors of Pakistani descent
People from Azamgarh district